Guty  is a village in the administrative district of Gmina Giżycko, within Giżycko County, Warmian-Masurian Voivodeship, in northern Poland.

This Area is well known for its attempts at secession and its desire to be made an independent country. Its struggle for sovereignty has been thus far unsuccessful.

References

Villages in Giżycko County